Sutton Hoo Helmet is a 2002 sculpture by the English artist Rick Kirby. A representation of the Anglo-Saxon helmet by the same name found in the Sutton Hoo ship-burial, it was commissioned by the National Trust to suspend outside an exhibition hall at the Sutton Hoo visitor centre. At the opening of the centre, the sculpture was unveiled by the Literature Nobel laureate Seamus Heaney on 13 March 2002. It remained in place, dominating the entrance of the exhibition hall, until 2019, when it was moved to the entrance to the Sutton Hoo site.

It is made of mild steel plates that are coloured red. Designed to have a "fierce presence", it is inspired by the fragmentary appearance of the reconstructed helmet rather than the glistening replica made by the Royal Armouries. Steel is Kirby's favoured medium, allowing the sense of scale and dramatic impact found in Sutton Hoo Helmet. The sculpture is illustrative of Kirby's largely figural body of work, and its mask-like quality has been repeated in subsequent pieces.

Background

In 1939, archaeologists excavating barrows overlooking the River Deben near Woodbridge, Suffolk, discovered an Anglo-Saxon grave of unparalleled wealth. The Sutton Hoo ship-burial was quickly labelled "Britain's Tutankhamun"; the finds reshaped views of what was then termed the Dark Ages, which—with new understandings of its wealth and sophistication—became known as the Middle Ages. The most iconic artefact, the Sutton Hoo helmet, was pieced together from more than 500 fragments. In the decades since, the Sutton Hoo helmet has come to symbolise the Middle Ages, archaeology, and England.

The Sutton Hoo finds were donated to the British Museum within weeks. The estate was privately owned until 1998, when its 245 acres, and Tranmer House (originally Sutton Hoo House and renamed by the Trust in honour of the donor), were bequeathed to the National Trust. In 2000 the Trust commissioned van Heyningen and Haward Architects to design a visitor centre. Their work included the overall planning of the estate, the design of an exhibition hall and visitor facilities, car park, and the restoration of the Edwardian house. The £5million visitor centre (equivalent to £million in ) was opened on 13 March 2002 by Nobel laureate Seamus Heaney, whose translation of Beowulf, an Anglo-Saxon epic poem that describes extravagant burial customs similar to those observed at Sutton Hoo, had been published in 1999.

The National Trust commissioned the English sculptor Rick Kirby to create a work for the visitor centre. He was tasked with making something with a "fierce presence". Kirby's works then included several public commissions, among them a sculpture outside St Thomas' Hospital, unveiled by Princess Margaret in 2000, and another in the Calne town centre, announced by Queen Elizabeth in 2001. The National Trust Sutton Hoo Helmet was winched into place above the entrance of the exhibition hall on 26 February 2002, ahead of its official unveiling in March. The sculpture remained above the doors, dominating the entrance, until 2019; on 30 May it was installed in a new location at the entrance.

In the course of making the sculpture, Kirby completed a mock-up, or maquette.

Description

Kirby's sculpture is based on the famous helmet found in the Sutton Hoo ship-burial, but is rendered on a much larger scale. The external structure rests on an internal steel frame.

Like the fragmented Anglo-Saxon helmet, Kirby's work is made of many pieces of metal, evoking an object reconstructed by an archaeologist. The sculpture intentionally emulates the fragmentary appearance of the helmet's second reconstruction, reassembled from 1970 to 1971 by Nigel Williams, rather than the glistening replica made by the Royal Armouries. Sutton Hoo Helmet was described by the National Trust as "fantastic—such a striking image and it has a real wow factor", and by the East Anglian Daily Times as an "iconic" sculpture greeting visitors to the site.

Both the material and the subject are typical of Kirby's work. Steel is Kirby's material of choice, for what he describes as "the ability to go huge" and its "whoom-factor!" Much of Kirby's other work focuses on the human face and form, and his later pieces Masks and Vertical Face repeat the same staring, unemotive quality.

References

Bibliography

  
 
  
  
 
 
  
 

2002 sculptures
Steel sculptures in England
Outdoor sculptures in England
Arts in Suffolk
Sutton Hoo